Wang Xiaoyan (born 7 January 1968) is a former Chinese gymnast who competed in the 1988 Summer Olympics.

References

1968 births
Living people
Chinese female artistic gymnasts
Gymnasts at the 1988 Summer Olympics
Sportspeople from Changchun
Olympic gymnasts of China
Gymnasts from Jilin